The German Academic Exchange Service (DAAD), founded in 1925, is the largest German support organisation in the field of international academic co-operation.

Organisation

DAAD is a private, federally funded and state-funded, self-governing national agency of the institutions of higher education in Germany, representing 365 German higher education institutions (100 universities and technical universities, 162 general universities of applied sciences, and 52 colleges of music and art) [2003].

The DAAD itself does not offer programs of study or courses, but awards competitive, merit-based grants for use toward study and/or research in Germany at any of the accredited German institutions of higher education. It also awards grants to German students, doctoral students, and scholars for studies and research abroad. With an annual budget of 522 million Euros and supporting approximately 140.000 individuals world-wide, the DAAD is in fact the largest such academic grant organisation worldwide The organisation was founded on 1 January 1925 but closed down in 1945, only to be re-founded again in 1950.

Headquarters and regional offices

The DAAD headquarters are in Bonn and there are 15 international regional branch offices that exist to provide information and advice on study and research opportunities, as well as available grants, tailored to students and academics within their region.

The DAAD New York office serves residents of the United States and Canada who are enrolled or employed at American and Canadian higher education institutions and would like to study or pursue research in Germany.  From the perspective of this side of the exchange, the DAAD's mission is to facilitate American and Canadian students' access to the distinguished German institutions of higher education and research—from research universities (Universitäten) to universities of applied sciences (Fachhochschule), colleges of music and art, libraries and archives, and research institutions such as the Max Planck Institutes.

DAAD scholarships and programmes 
The DAAD scholarship grants administered by the DAAD abroad are available to students of all academic disciplines and at each academic degree level, including undergraduates, graduating undergraduates and recent graduates with a BA, master's degree students, doctoral students, PhD candidates and postdoctoral scholars, and faculty.

The DAAD worldwide network also includes around 50 information centers and around 450 DAAD lecturer positions.
DAAD scholarship is one of the top scholarships offered by European country Germany for outstanding international students. Every year Students are selected on merit basis and offered a DAAD scholarship to study postgraduate degree masters and PhD in German universities.

Notable DAAD Alumni
Michelle Bachelet, politician
Margaret Atwood, writer
Söhnke M. Bartram, economist
Unsuk Chin, composer
Willie Doherty, artist
Jeffrey Eugenides, writer
Jim Jarmusch, film director
Ryszard Kapuściński, journalist
Nam June Paik, artist
Susan Sontag, writer and filmmaker
Bob Wilson, theatre director
Ghil'ad Zuckermann, linguist and revivalist
Emmett Williams, Fluxus artist

Additionally, several Nobel Prize Winners are DAAD alumni. For example, Günter Blobel (1999), Gao Xingjian (2000), Wolfgang Ketterle (2001), Imre Kertész (2002),  Wangari Maathai (2004), Herta Müller (2009), Mario Vargas Llosa (2009), Svetlana Alexievich (2015), Leo Hoffmann-Axthelm (2017), Olga Tokarczuk (2018), Peter Handke (2019) and others.

Funding 
The DAAD is mainly funded by the German government and the European Union. In 2017, the DAAD received 522 million Euro.

Foreign Office (Germany): EUR 185m
Federal Ministry of Education and Research (Germany): EUR 137m
Federal Ministry of Economic Cooperation and Development (Germany): EUR 54m
European Union: EUR 110m
Others: EUR 36m

Leadership for Syria Programme
During the fall of 2014, the DAAD, supported by the German Ministry of Foreign Affairs, launched a program called the Leadership for Syria. The declared aim of the program was to create "a select elite among Syria's future leadership" for "active participation in organizing" post-war Syria. In the initial stage of the program, 271 Syrians seen as suitable for university scholarships were chosen from potential candidates who were "either still living in Syria or in one of the bordering countries (Lebanon, Jordan, Turkey), or who had fled to Germany". The former were then brought to Germany to join those participants who were already there. The scholarships were to various universities throughout Germany. The German Foreign Office funded the bulk of the scholarships (200) with the balance being sponsored by Baden Württemberg (50) and North Rhine Westphalia (21). The scholarship curriculum included an introductory language course for those students who were not already fluent in, or otherwise had no prior knowledge of, German. Alongside this was a concomitant obligatory element intended to imbue the planned future Syrian elite with the "fundamental and practical knowledge and skills in political sciences, economics, social sciences, as well as operational competence."

See also
 Franco-German University
 List of Nobel laureates

External links

DAAD Homepage

References

Academic transfer
Government scholarships
Organizations established in 1925
Higher education in Germany
Educational foundations
Foundations based in Germany
Higher education organisations based in Europe
Organisations based in Bonn
Study abroad programs
Social engineering (political science)
German involvement in the Syrian civil war